Brahim Abdelkader Díaz (born 3 August 1999), known as Brahim Díaz or simply Brahim, is a Moroccan Spanish professional footballer who plays as a forward for  club AC Milan, on loan from La Liga club Real Madrid.

Club career

Manchester City
Brahim began his career at his hometown club Málaga, before moving to Manchester City in 2015 as a 16-year-old for an initial £200,000 fee. On 21 September 2016, Díaz made his first-team debut for City, coming on as an 80th-minute substitute to replace Kelechi Iheanacho in an EFL Cup tie against Swansea City. Five days later, he signed his first professional contract with City, for three years.

On 21 November 2017, Brahim made his Champions League debut against Feyenoord, coming on in injury time for Raheem Sterling. On 19 December 2017, Brahim made his first club start, playing for 88 minutes against Leicester City in the League Cup. He made his Premier League debut on 20 January 2018, in a 3–1 victory over Newcastle United. and on 13 May, he received a winner's medal after appearing sporadically in four more league games over the season.

On 5 August 2018, Brahim played the final 15 minutes in place of Phil Foden a 2–0 win over Chelsea in the 2018 FA Community Shield. Later that season, Brahim would score his first career goal for City, netting both times in a 2–0 win over Fulham on 1 November.

Real Madrid
Following intense transfer speculation, coupled with his contract with Manchester City due to expire in June 2019, Brahim joined Real Madrid on 6 January, for a transfer fee of £15.5 million (€17 million). His contract, which runs until 2025, also includes potential add-ons, which could see the value of the transfer to rise to £22 million (€24 million). The transfer also includes clauses which stipulates a 15 per cent sell-on fee to be received by City, which would rise to 40 per cent should Brahim depart Madrid and transfer to "another Manchester club".

He made his debut on 9 January 2019, coming on as a substitute in a 3–0 victory over Leganés in the Copa del Rey. His league debut came four days later, when he again came in as a substitute in a 2–1 win over Real Betis. He scored his first goal on 12 May 2019, in a 1–3 defeat at Real Sociedad.

He made six appearances during the league season, as Real Madrid won the 2019–20 La Liga.

Loan to AC Milan
On 4 September 2020, Real Madrid announced that Brahim would be loaned out to AC Milan for the duration of the 2020–21 season. On 27 September, he scored his first goal in a 2–0 away win over Crotone. On 9 May 2021, he scored a goal in a 3–0 away win over Juventus. After the 2020–21 season, he was loaned for another two years to AC Milan with a buyout option. On 15 September 2021, he scored his first Champions League goal against Liverpool in a 3–2 defeat in the 2021–22 Champions League group stage. On 8 October 2022, Brahim scored his second goal against Juventus in a league game, finishing after a run to double the advantage as he seized a loose pass and knocked it around the Juventus defender Leonardo Bonucci to get through on goal, and then finished past Wojciech Szczęsny. On 14 February 2023, he scored the only goal in a 1–0 victory over Tottenham Hotspur in the 2022–23 Champions League round of 16.

International career
Brahim is a youth international for Spain, and made his first appearances at age 16, where he received praise for his performances for Spain's U17s in the 2016 UEFA European Under-17 Championship.

Due to the isolation of some national team players following the positive COVID-19 test of Sergio Busquets, Spain's under-21 squad were called up for the international friendly against Lithuania on 8 June 2021. Brahim made his senior debut in the match and scored the second goal in a 4–0 victory against Lithuania. On 27 January 2023, it was announced that Brahim planned to switch allegiances to the Morocco national team.

Personal life
Brahim, as he was born in Spain to a Spanish mother and a Moroccan father, was eligible to play for Morocco.

On 15 October 2021, it was announced that Diaz had contracted COVID-19. By 26 October he had recovered.

Career statistics

Club

International

Spain score listed first, score column indicates score after each Brahim goal

Honours
Manchester City
 Premier League: 2017–18
 FA Community Shield: 2018

Real Madrid
 La Liga: 2019–20

AC Milan
 Serie A: 2021–22

Spain U17
 UEFA European Under-17 Championship runner-up: 2016

Individual
 Serie A Goal of the Month: October 2022

References

External links 

 Profile at the AC Milan website
 
 

1999 births
Living people
Footballers from Málaga
Spanish footballers
Spain youth international footballers
Spain under-21 international footballers
Spain international footballers
Association football forwards
Málaga CF players
Manchester City F.C. players
Real Madrid CF players
A.C. Milan players
Premier League players
La Liga players
Serie A players
Spanish expatriate footballers
Expatriate footballers in England
Expatriate footballers in Italy
Spanish expatriate sportspeople in England
Spanish expatriate sportspeople in Italy
Spanish sportspeople of Moroccan descent